Lawrani (Aymara lawra a kind of fish, -ni a suffix, "the one with the lawra fish", also spelled Laurani) is a mountain in the Andes of Bolivia which reaches a height of approximately . It is located in the Oruro Department, Nor Carangas Province (which is identical to the Huayllamarca Municipality).

References 

Mountains of Oruro Department